The Young Stranger is a 1957 low-budget drama film, the directorial debut of John Frankenheimer. Starring Academy Award winning actress Kim Hunter and James MacArthur, it was based on the teleplay Deal a Blow by Robert Dozier.

Plot 
Teenage delinquent Hal Ditmar is the son of a wealthy film producer, Tom Ditmar. Hal lives with his mother and father yet does not work and contributes nothing to the household. Hal gets into an argument in a theater, which ends with Hal hitting the theater manager. Neither the police nor Hal's father believe his claim that he acted in self-defense; however, when Mr. Ditmar discusses the matter with Sgt. Shipley, the police consider the delinquent act more serious than does the father. Mr. Ditmar takes Hal home and berates him. The next day, Hal is teased at school and considered a bad influence by other parents. Because his father won't believe him, Hal questions his father's love for him; however, Hal's mother tells him that his father once told her Hal was the only thing he did love, implying that Mr. Ditmar did not love her. At dinner, Mr Ditmar tells Hal the police want to see Hal the next day, but does not tell him why. At bedtime, Mrs. Ditmar tells Mr. Ditmar she has considered separation for five years. Mr. Ditmar tells her he loves her, but she leaves the bedroom. The next day, the police offer to keep Hal's transgression out of juvenile court if he will confess. Hal refuses. The theater manager drops the charges because of Mr. Ditmar, and to give Hal a break. Asked to at least apologize, Hal arrogantly refuses.  Mrs. Ditmar apologizes for Hal and promises no more trouble.

Mr. Ditmar learns of Hal's surly behavior at the police station and threatens to ground him. Hal explodes telling his father that he doesn't even know him and only talks to him when he's upset with him. Prohibited from driving, Hal leaves on his bicycle. Mrs. Ditmar tells her husband that he only sees Hal at dinner and Hal doesn't even know his father loves him. Hal goes to the movie theater and apologizes to the theater manager, but wants the manager to explain to Mr. Ditmar that it was self-defense. The manager refuses and the two begin scuffling which ends with Hal hitting the manager once again. Back at the police station, Hal explains to Sgt. Shipley what happened, but doubts he will believe him. Sgt. Shipley questions the manager about the first assault. The manager admits Hal acted in self-defense, but denies the second assault was self-defense. Sgt. Shipley doesn't believe the manager; and asks Mr. Ditmar why he didn't believe Hal the first time. Mr. Ditmar says he didn't think believing Hal was important, and realizes he was wrong. Mr. Ditmar tells Hal about the manager's admission, and tells Hal he's glad he hit the manager and not him. They leave the police station with Mr. Ditmar putting his arm around Hal.

Cast

 James MacArthur as Hal Ditmar
 James Daly as Tom Ditmar
 Kim Hunter as Helen Ditmar
 James Gregory as Sgt. Shipley
 Whit Bissell as Theater Manager

References

External links 

 

1957 films
1957 drama films
1950s English-language films
Films scored by Leonard Rosenman
Films based on television plays
Films directed by John Frankenheimer
American drama films
1957 directorial debut films
1950s American films